Abruzzo is an important red and white wine grape in Abruzzo.

History
It was established as a red wine DOC in 2010.

Viticulture
Principal Red Grape Varieties: Montepulciano
Principal White Grape Varieties:Chardonnay, Cococciola, Gewürztraminer, Malvasia, Montonico Bianco, Moscato, Passerina, Pecorino, Riesling, Sauvignon Blanc

References

White wine grape varieties
Red wine grape varieties
Wine grapes of Italy
Crops originating from Europe
Italian DOC
Cuisine of Abruzzo
Wines of Abruzzo